Chapter Two is the second album by American composer Bill Laswell issued under the moniker Sacred System. It was released on September 16, 1997 by ROIR.

Track listing

Personnel 
Adapted from the Chapter Two liner notes.
Musicians
Bill Buchen – gamelan, slit drum, tablas, water drums
Graham Haynes – flugelhorn, cornet
Bill Laswell – bass guitar, effects, producer
Style Scott – drum programming
Nicky Skopelitis – six-string guitar, twelve-string guitar, sitar
Technical personnel
Michael Fossenkemper – mastering
Abdul Malik Mansur – illustrations
Robert Musso – recording, engineering

Release history

References

External links 
 Chapter Two (Sacred System album) at Bandcamp
 

1997 albums
Bill Laswell albums
ROIR albums
Albums produced by Bill Laswell